This is the list of cathedrals in the Dominican Republic sorted by denomination.

Anglican
 Catedral de la Epifania/Union Church, Santo Domingo (The Episcopal Church)

Roman Catholic 
Cathedrals of the Roman Catholic Church in the Dominican Republic:
 Basilica Cathedral of Santa María la Menor (Catedral Primada de América),  Ciudad Colonial, Santo Domingo
 Basílica Catedral Metropolitana Santa María de la Encarnación, Santo Domingo
 Catedral Nuestra Señora de Regla, Baní
 Catedral Nuestra Señora del Rosario, Barahona
 Basílica Catedral Nuestra Señora de la Altagracia, Higüey
 Immaculate Conception Cathedral, La Vega
 Catedral Santa Cruz, Mao
 St. Philip the Apostle Cathedral, Puerto Plata
 Santa Ana Cathedral, San Francisco de Macorís
 Catedral San Juan Bautista, San Juan de la Maguana
 Catedral San Pedro Apóstol, San Pedro de Macorís
 St. James the Apostle Cathedral, Santiago de los Caballeros

See also
Lists of cathedrals

References

Cathedrals
Dominican Republic
Cathedrals